Lomariocycas tabularis, synonym Blechnum tabulare, known as the mountain blechnum is a large, attractive fern that is indigenous to sub-saharan Africa.

Description
They grow in a similar way to the classic tree ferns (Cyathea), and are also often mistaken for being cycads.

This species can be distinguished from related species by the bases of its pinnae. This is the only species in which the base of each pinna has an uneven shape. All other species have equally shaped pinna bases.

Distribution and habitat
It occurs from Cape Town, South Africa, in the south, as far north as Uganda and Nigeria. This fern's natural habitat is along river banks and on the margins of afro-montane forests. It grows very well in shady areas, making it a popular plant for African gardens. Unfortunately this has led to a large illegal trade in these plants which has seen their numbers decline.

References

External links
 Plantz-Africa treatment: Blechnum tabulare
 

Blechnaceae
Ferns of Africa
Flora of Africa
Afromontane flora